Ultzindur (fl. 460) was a Hun nobleman and a blood relative of Attila.

He lived in the Danube region after Attila (that is, after the death of the Hunnic king and the collapse of his empire), along with Emnetzur, who was also a blood relative of Attila. They held "Oescus, Utum and Almus on the right bank of the Danube", in Dacia Ripensis.

Etymology
His name, like Tuldich, Tuldila, has uld-, ult- as its first element.

References

Huns
Attila the Hun
5th-century rulers in Europe